John Marriott (1780–1825) was an English poet and clergyman. Marriott was born at Cottesbach, in 1780, and educated at Rugby, and Christ Church, Oxford. He was the second of two who obtained honours in the schools in 1802, the first year in which there was a public examination for honours at Oxford. He was also Student of Christ Church, and for about two years a private tutor in the family of the Duke of Buccleuch. The Duke presented him to the Rectory of Church Lawford, Warwickshire. This benefice he retained to his death, although his wife's poor health compelled him to reside in Devonshire, where he was successively curate of St. Lawrence and other parishes in Exeter, and of Broadclyst, near Exeter, where he died March 31, 1825. His published works include a volume of Sermons which he issued in 1818, and a posthumous volume of Sermons, published by his sons in 1838. His hymns were never published by himself, nor in book form by any one. His best known hymn is "Thou, whose almighty word", which is usually sung to the tune "Moscow", based on a melody by Italian violinist, Felice de Giardini, who was resident in Russia's capital.
Marriott was a close friend of Sir Walter Scott who spoke of him in the second canto of 'Marmion' as someone with whom he could talk about poetry.

References

1780 births
1825 deaths
19th-century English poets
19th-century English writers